Keshav-Sen, also known as "Keshab Sen" in vernacular literature, was the sixth and last known ruler of the Sen dynasty of the Bengal region on the Indian subcontinent. He was succeeded by Suryasena, who was a vassal of the Devas, with his lineage ending after two more kings.

See also
List of rulers of Bengal
History of Bengal

References

Rulers of Bengal
Year of death unknown
13th-century Indian monarchs